The English women's national rugby sevens team has competed in the Hong Kong Women's Sevens tournaments since 1997. England are also one of six teams announced by the International Rugby Board as "core teams" that will compete in all four rounds of the inaugural IRB Women's Sevens World Series in 2012–13. England won the bronze medal at the 2018 Commonwealth Games.

At the 2018 Rugby World Cup Sevens they lost to Ireland in the opening game of the tournament and were knocked out of the Championship Cup. They defeated Japan to win the Challenge Trophy Final and placed ninth overall. England, representing Great Britain, won the 2019 Rugby Europe Women's Sevens, thus qualifying for the 2020 Olympics.

Tournament history

Rugby World Cup Sevens

Commonwealth Games

Rugby X Tournament

Honours
Hong Kong Women's Sevens 2001 Cup Semi Finals
Hong Kong Women's Sevens 2003 Cup Final
Hong Kong Women's Sevens 2012 Cup Final
2019 Rugby X Tournament champions

Players

Previous squads

Head coach: James Bailey

• Rachael Burford • Heather Fisher • Sonia Green • Natasha Hunt • Sarah McKenna • Katherine Merchant • Isabelle Noel-Smith • Alice Richardson • Emily Scarratt • Michaela Staniford (C) • Joanne Watmore • Kay Wilson

World Rugby Women's Sevens Series

 2012-13 - 2nd 
 2013-14 - 4th

 2014-15 - 4th
 2015-16 - 4th

 2016-17 - 8th

See also
 England women's national rugby union team

References

External links
 

Women's national rugby sevens teams
Sevens
World Rugby Women's Sevens Series core teams